Pseudogyrtona is a genus of moths of the family Erebidae. The genus was erected by George Thomas Bethune-Baker in 1908.

Pseudogyrtona bilineatoides Poole, 1989 New Guinea
Pseudogyrtona fulvana Bethune-Baker, 1908 New Guinea, Queensland
Pseudogyrtona hemicyclopis Hampson, 1926 Borneo
Pseudogyrtona hypenina (Rothschild, 1915) New Guinea
Pseudogyrtona marmorea (Wileman & South, 1916) Taiwan
Pseudogyrtona mesoscia Hampson, 1926 Philippines (Luzon)
Pseudogyrtona modesta (Moore, [1884]) Sri Lanka
Pseudogyrtona nigrivitta Hampson, 1926 Malawi
Pseudogyrtona ochreopuncta Wileman & South, 1916 Taiwan
Pseudogyrtona octosema Hampson, 1926 Borneo
Pseudogyrtona perversa (Walker, 1862) Borneo, Sri Lanka
Pseudogyrtona trichocera Hampson, 1926 Philippines (Luzon)

References

Calpinae
Moth genera